Awheaturris experta is an extinct species of sea snail, a marine gastropod mollusk in the family Raphitomidae.

Description

Distribution
Fossils of this marine species were found in Miocene strata in New Zealand; age range: 11.608 to 5.332 Ma.

References

 Laws, C. R. Tertiary Mollusca from Hokianga District, North Auckland. AU, 1947.
 Maxwell, P.A. (2009). Cenozoic Mollusca. pp 232–254 in Gordon, D.P. (ed.) New Zealand inventory of biodiversity. Volume one. Kingdom Animalia: Radiata, Lophotrochozoa, Deuterostomia. Canterbury University Press, Christchurch

experta
Gastropods described in 1947